The 2016 Coupe de la Ligue Final was the 22nd final of France's football league cup competition, the Coupe de la Ligue, a competition for the 42 teams that the Ligue de Football Professionnel (LFP) manages. The final took place on 23 April 2016 at the Stade de France in Saint-Denis and was contested by reigning champions Paris Saint-Germain, and Lille.

Background
Paris Saint-Germain were the two-time reigning champions, having won a record fifth title in the previous year's final with a 4–0 win over Bastia. It was PSG's sixth final – a joint record with Bordeaux – and they had previously won five (1995, 1998, 2008, 2014 and 2015) and lost one (2000).

Lille had never before reached the final.

Match

References

External links
 

Cup
2016
Paris Saint-Germain F.C. matches
Lille OSC matches
April 2016 sports events in France
Sport in Saint-Denis, Seine-Saint-Denis
Football competitions in Paris
2016 in Paris